The scale length of a string instrument is the maximum vibrating length of the strings that produce sound, and determines the range of tones that string can produce at a given tension. It is also called string length. On instruments in which strings are not "stopped" (typically by frets or the player's fingers) or divided in length (such as in the piano), it is the actual length of string between the nut and the bridge.

String instruments produce sound through the vibration of their strings. The range of tones these strings can produce is determined by three primary factors: the linear density of the string, that is its mass per unit length (which is determined by its thickness and the density of the material), the tension placed upon it, and the instrument's scale length.

Generally, a string instrument has all strings approximately the same length, so the scale length can be expressed as a single measurement, e.g., the violin and most guitars.

Bowed strings

Violin family
Later makers have been unwilling to deviate from this. (There was variance in scale length in the earliest violins, and almost all of those in current use have had the necks replaced, with the original scroll grafted, so statements of consistent scroll length during that time is somewhat speculative.)

Smaller scale instruments are used extensively to teach younger players. The size of these is described by a "conventional" fraction that has no mathematical significance. For example, a 7/8 violin has a scale of about 317 mm, a 3/4-size instrument a scale of 307 mm, a half-size one 287 mm, and a quarter-size one 267 mm. 1/8, 1/10, 1/16 and 1/32 and even 1/64 violins also exist, becoming progressively smaller, but again in no proportional relationship. (A full-size instrument is described as 4/4.)

Cellos exist in a smaller range of sizes than violins, with 4/4, 3/4, 1/2, 1/4, 1/8, and 1/10 being reasonably common.

Violas are commonly described in terms of their body length rather than—as with other violin-family instruments—by a fraction. There are two reasons for this. First, unlike that of the violin and the cello, the viola scale length has not standardised, but rather advanced players use whatever scale length best suits them. Secondly, student sizes are not as often required, as most viola players who start learning at a young age start on the violin.

Double bass
There is some variation in the scale length of an orchestral double bass, generally in the range . There are also smaller versions of this "full scale" double bass with the same scale length but with a smaller sound box, intended for other musical idioms. Smaller scale instruments are also quite commonly used by fully-grown players in jazz, folk music and similar ensembles.

The system of conventional fractions is taken to its logical conclusion with string bass sizes, in that a full-size (4/4) bass is uncommon. Most basses are 3/4 or 7/8, and younger players can use 1/2 or even 1/4 size instruments.

Guitars

Classical guitar
Like that of the violin, the scale of the classical guitar was standardized by the work of its most famous maker. However, from the mid- 20th Century luthiers seeking increased volume have moved to a  scale, which is now the standard for such leading makers as Ramirez.

Steel-string acoustic guitar
The steel-string acoustic guitar typically has a scale slightly shorter than the classical instrument, the most common scales ranging between short scale and long scale. Small travel guitars and guitars specifically designed for children can have even shorter scales.

Electric guitar
Electric guitars reflect the range of scale lengths found with steel-string acoustics. With regard to tone, a longer scale favors "brightness" or cleaner overtones and more separated harmonics versus a shorter scales, which favors "warmth" or more muddy overtones. According to Dave Hunter's Tone Manual (2011), each scale length has its characteristic sound and tone, which is individual from other sounds in the tone chain: strings, pickups, pedals, amplifiers, speakers, and cabinets.

Gibson has used other scale lengths on various models through the years. Gibson's nominal "24.75" in scale length has itself varied, sometimes measuring  depending on the production equipment used. As Gibson necks are not often interchangeable, this usually goes unnoticed in practice.

Bass guitar
The first electric basses were upright electric basses built in the 1930s by fitting an otherwise normal double bass with electric pickups, and so had a scale length of about 43" (109 cm).

In 1951 the Fender Precision Bass shortened this to 34" (86 cm). This is still often regarded as the standard length for a bass guitar. On a modern bass guitar, 30" (76 cm) or less is considered short scale; standard (also called long) scale is 34" (86 cm) for a 4-string and 35" (89 cm) for a B-E-A-D-G 5-string, and extra-long scale basses of 36" (91 cm) also exist.

Other chordophones

Mandolin family
Mandolin: 14.1 in (36 cm)
Mandola: 20.2 in (51 cm)
Octave mandolin: 22.75 in (58 cm)
Mandocello 27 in (686 mm)

Ukulele
Soprano ukulele: 13.6 in (35 cm)
Concert ukulele: 14.75 in (37 cm)
Tenor ukulele: 17 in (43 cm)
Baritone ukulele: 20.1 in (51 cm)
Contrabass ukulele:

Banjo
Banjo: (Gibson five string standard and plectrum) 
Tenor banjo (19 fret)

Piano

The scale length of a piano is the length of the longest string. As this is normally the lowest bass note, it is a single string.

Grand piano
Notable concert grands include:

Smaller grand pianos vary in naming. Others are intended for larger homes, and may have a simplified action lacking the repeat lever that is only useful for advanced players.

Baby grand pianos are the smallest, intended for homes, restaurants and similar applications where the grand style of piano is desired even at the expense of the longer scale and better sound that an upright format would permit in the available space.

See also
Fingerboard
Multi-scale fingerboard

Notes

Further reading
"Lutherie Info – Measuring Scale Length of Stringed Instruments" by R.M. Mottola, on the Liutaio Mottola Lutherie Information Website.
"Fender's 3/4 Scale Guitars", a two-part article by Tim Pershing in 20th Century Guitar magazine, December 1996 and January 1997.

External links
Instrument plans index gives some scale lengths.
scale lengths - discussion of the effect of scale length.
Bass guitar buying guide discusses scale length.
Vintage guitars with dimensions.
Listing of some orchestral basses giving both body and scale lengths.
 Real Guitar Solo
 Road Toad Music's UBass Page

String instrument construction